Geisa Rafaela Arcanjo (born 19 September 1991, in São Roque, São Paulo) is a Brazilian athlete. She was a finalist at the 2012 Summer Olympics, finishing sixth. Her personal best for the event is 19.02 metres. She was the 2012 gold medallist at the Ibero-American Championships in Athletics. Arcanjo initially won at the 2010 World Junior Championships in Athletics but was disqualified for doping.

Career
Born in São Roque, São Paulo,  she started in athletics by competing in the shot put and the discus throw. She made her debut for Brazil at the 2007 World Youth Championships in Athletics, competing in the discus. Her first international medal came in 2008 when she was the gold medallist in the shot put at the 2008 South American Youth Championships in Athletics. She also won the Brazilian youth titles in both the discus and shot. The following year she stepped up to the junior (under 19) level. She had similar success, winning the shot put gold and discus silver at the South American Junior Championships as well as a shot put bronze medal at the Pan American Junior Championships.

She began to focus on shot put in 2010 and threw a Brazilian junior record of 17.11 m. She came fifth at the South American Games and fourth at the Ibero-American Championships. At the 2010 World Junior Championships in Athletics, she won Brazil's first gold medal at the championships since 1994. However, her doping test came back positive for the banned diuretic Hydrochlorothiazide and she was later disqualified. Arcanjo said that the substance had entered her system through a green tea that she had been taking, unbeknownst to her coach. An initial judgment by the national athletics body (Confederação Brasileira de Atletismo) accepted the athlete's statement and gave her a warning rather than a ban. Brazil's sports court, Superior Tribunal de Justiça Desportiva, overturned this decision on these grounds but upheld the warning due to the lack of enhancing impact that the substance would have on the athlete's performance. Arcanjo missed much of the 2011 season due to the length of the proceedings.

Arcanjo had significantly improved when she returned to action in 2012, setting a series of personal bests on the Brazilian circuit. She cleared eighteen metres for the first time at the 2012 Ibero-American Championships in Athletics, where she won the shot put with a personal best of 18.84 metres. After winning her first Brazilian title, she was selected for the Brazilian team for the 2012 London Olympics. Her throw of 19.02 metres in the Olympic final was enough for seventh place. She ended her season with a win at the 2012 South American Under-23 Championships in Athletics.

She finished 9th in the Shot Put at the 2015 Pan American Games.

At the 2015 World Championships in Athletics, she finished 15th in the Women's shot put. 

She competed at the 2020 Summer Olympics.

After the 2012 Olympic Games, her performance dropped a lot, never matching her Olympic mark of 19m02, and retiring in 2022, after ten years with little relevant results even in competitions like the Pan American Games, where she would theoretically be a favorite.

Personal bests

International competitions

References

External links

1991 births
Living people
Brazilian female shot putters
Athletes (track and field) at the 2012 Summer Olympics
Athletes (track and field) at the 2016 Summer Olympics
Olympic athletes of Brazil
Doping cases in athletics
Brazilian sportspeople in doping cases
Athletes (track and field) at the 2015 Pan American Games
World Athletics Championships athletes for Brazil
South American Games bronze medalists for Brazil
South American Games medalists in athletics
Competitors at the 2010 South American Games
Athletes (track and field) at the 2018 South American Games
Pan American Games athletes for Brazil
Ibero-American Championships in Athletics winners
Troféu Brasil de Atletismo winners
Athletes (track and field) at the 2020 Summer Olympics
Sportspeople from São Paulo (state)
21st-century Brazilian women
People from São Roque, São Paulo